The 47th Tour of Flanders cycling classic was held on Sunday, 31 March 1963. It was won by Belgian Noël Foré in a three-man sprint with Frans Melckenbeeck and Tom Simpson.

Route
The race started in Ghent and finished in Gentbrugge – covering . There were six categorized climbs:

Results

References

External links
 Video of the 1963 Tour of Flanders  on Sporza (in Dutch)

Tour of Flanders
1963 in road cycling
1963 in Belgian sport
1963 Super Prestige Pernod